Swing is an American romantic comedy film directed by Martin Guigui and starring Constance Brenneman, Innis Casey, Tom Skerritt, Jacqueline Bisset, Jonathan Winters, Nell Carter, Dahlia Waingort, Adam Tomei, Barry Bostwick, Mindy Cohn.

Plot
Anthony is caught between dreams of being a musician and pleasing his father and fiancé. Encouraged by his great uncle, Anthony finds inspiration from a mysterious older woman in an other worldly night club, who teaches him to find happiness through swing dancing.

Reception
Considered one of the top "swing" films of all time, the film still received a 42% rating from Rotten Tomatoes.

References

Sources 
http://www.imdb.com/title/tt0358722/
http://www.sfgate.com/cgi-bin/article.cgi?f=/c/a/2005/02/11/DDG8QB8I041.DTL
http://www.nytimes.com/2004/07/09/movies/film-review-a-sexy-ghost-can-be-a-great-dance-partner.html

https://www.filmfest-muenchen.de/en/festival/news/2015/05/open-air-swing/

2003 films
2003 romantic comedy films
American romantic comedy films
2000s English-language films
2000s American films